Greater Chimgan (3,309 m) of the Chatkal Mountain range (the Western Tian Shan) is located in the territory of the Ugam-Chatkal National Park, and it is in the Bostanlyk administrative district (Tashkent Province), Uzbekistan.

The Chimgan village was settled 400–500 years ago in the mountain massive of dominant the Greater Chimgan peak (3,309 m), at an altitude of 1,620 m.

Some experts see Chinese words in the name "Chimgan" but others translate it as "sod" or "pasture abundant in water, green valley".

For generations of those, who live in Tashkent province, the Greater Chimgan is the place of romantic gravitation.

Greater Chimgan (3,309m) has been known to mountaineers since the beginning of the 20th century.

For those who want to experience of rock climbing, hiking and mountaineering Chimgan Highlands caters many opportunities. Chimgan Highlands have been a host for many other outdoor activities such as hang gliding, skiing, snowboarding and horseback riding.

For many years the Greater Chimgan was the first challenge for thousands beginners of Soviet mountaineering.

A great number of routes of several levels of complexity (from 1B to 4B inclusively) allows a wide spectrum of mountaineering. Beginners at climbing usually take on the uncomplicated western ridge of the Greater Chimgan Mountain (1B), while there are plenty of more complicated routes for experienced climbers.

Climate and seasons

Climatic conditions in Chimgan are determined by the mountainous part of the Ugam-Chatkal National Nature Park. The climate is continental; there are seasonal and daily fluctuations. During the day it is warm, the evenings are cool. Spring comes in April in the mid-mountains; in the high mountains there is snow and cold until midsummer. The highest temperature is in June–July and early-August. Mean daily temperature of the warmest month (July) fluctuates from 20 to 35 degrees Celsius. Average annual precipitation is 650 mm. Heavy snowfall is in winter, which allows skiing and snowboarding. Snow cover lasts for 4–5 months. The frost period lasts about 130 days.

Accessibility

Chimgan is located 60 km from Gazalkent regional centre and 40 km from Hojikent railway station. The closest airport having international and local importance is in Tashkent, 100 km away. A new expressway from Tashkent to Hojikent is paved with high-quality pavement; in some places there is artificial illumination. Chimgan is further reachable from Gazalkent by public bus (50 min). There are bus routes Chimgan-Gazalkent (time of departure is 6:30 and 13:30) and Gazalkent-Chimgan (10:30 and 14:30). Private cars including taxis can also be used to get there. The road is accessible any time of the year, but in spring there can be limitations because of landslides and mudflows. In winter avalanches make the route dangerous. Alternative means of transportation are helicopters (but their use is limited).

Images from Chimgan

References

External links
 Chimgan Mountains Trekking Chimgan Photos. Uzbekistan
 Winter Trekking Chimgan Mountains Photos. Uzbekistan

Mountains of Uzbekistan
International mountains of Asia